Kotokaze Kōki (born 26 April 1957 as Koichi Nakayama) is a former sumo wrestler from Tsu, Mie, Japan. Beginning his career in 1971, he reached the top makuuchi division in 1977 but after a serious injury in 1979 he fell greatly in rank before staging a comeback. His highest rank was ōzeki, which he reached in 1981. He won two tournament championships and was a runner-up in two others. He won six special prizes and six gold stars for defeating yokozuna. He retired in 1985 and became an elder of the Japan Sumo Association and the head coach of Oguruma stable.

Career
Scouted by the 53rd Yokozuna Kotozakura, he joined Sadogatake stable in July 1971. He was only 14 years old and still at junior high school, and in his early days in the jonidan division he was excused from fighting some matches to attend school, not travelling to the regional tournaments and fighting only on Sunday in the Tokyo ones. He reached the sekitori level in November 1975 upon promotion to the second highest jūryō division and in January 1977 he made his debut in the top makuuchi division. He got as far as sekiwake before suffering a severe injury to his left knee joint which forced him to miss several tournaments and plunge all the way down to the unsalaried makushita division. He made his way back to the top division in just one year. By March 1981 he had returned to sekiwake and in September 1981 he captured his first tournament championship with a 12–3 record, finishing one win ahead of yokozuna Wakanohana II.  He was immediately promoted to sumo's second highest rank of ōzeki. For a brief period in January 1982 he was the only ōzeki on the banzuke, a rare occurrence not seen again until 2020. He took his second championship in January 1983 with a 14–1 score, beating Asashio in a playoff. In September 1984 he defeated a newcomer to the division who was in contention for the tournament title, the gigantic Konishiki, in a mammoth two-minute struggle on the final day. Kotokaze later recalled this bout as his most memorable ever. In May 1985 he suffered another serious injury, this time to his right knee, and he decided to retire in November 1985 at the age of twenty eight.

After retirement
Kotokaze became an elder of the Sumo Association under the name Oguruma-oyakata. In 1987 he left Sadogatake to set up his own Oguruma stable. He gives all of his new recruits shikona with the suffix "kaze" (wind), taken from his own fighting name. The first wrestler from the stable to achieve sekitori status was Tomikaze in July 2000. As of March 2019, Oguruma stable has produced six wrestlers with top division experience, Takekaze, Yoshikaze, Kimikaze, Amakaze, Yago and Tomokaze. Another, Wakakirin, (who originally came from a different stable) was dismissed from the Sumo Association because of cannabis use in February 2009. Oguruma was demoted from his post in the Sumo Association as a result. In despair he briefly considered closing his stable, but was told by Yoshikaze that he would retire if Oguruma was no longer his stablemaster. In September 2010, two men were arrested for attempting to blackmail Kotokaze, sending him a letter threatening to reveal his connections to a "violent criminal gang" (usually a euphemism for yakuza) in his younger years. In April 2011 he was hit with another demotion after a jūryō division wrestler from his stable, Hoshikaze, was forced to retire after a match-fixing scandal.  However, in February 2012 he was elected to the Sumo Association board of directors. In April 2012 he was hospitalized after injuring his cervical spine in a fall at Obama, Fukui. In 2019 he instructed wrestlers that they would no longer be allowed to grow five o'clock shadows during tournaments for superstitious reasons, in order to maintain a suitable appearance on the dohyō. As head of the Sumo Association's legal compliance committee, he announced the one-year suspension for Asanoyama in June 2021 for breaking COVID-19 protocols. Earlier in the same year he had warned that tournaments could be cancelled due to rising COVID-19 infections.

Kotokaze is also a regular commentator on NHK's sumo tournament broadcasts.

Kotokaze announced on 25 December 2021 that his stable would close following the January 2022 sumo tournament. He reached the standard retirement age for an elder of 65 years in April 2022, but was employed for a further five years on a reduced salary as a sanyo or consultant.

Fighting style
Kotokaze's most common winning kimarite or technique was overwhelmingly a straightforward yori-kiri or force out, which accounted for over half his wins at sekitori level. He favoured hidari-yotsu, or a right hand outside, left hand inside grip on his opponent's mawashi. He very rarely employed throwing moves.

Career record

See also
Glossary of sumo terms
List of ōzeki
List of past sumo wrestlers
List of sumo elders
List of sumo tournament top division champions
List of sumo tournament top division runners-up
List of sumo tournament second division champions

References

External links
 Oguruma stable profile

1957 births
Living people
Japanese sumo wrestlers
Ōzeki
People from Tsu, Mie
Sumo people from Mie Prefecture
Sadogatake stable sumo wrestlers